Anastazewo  (German 1939-1945 Annendorf) is a village in the administrative district of Gmina Powidz, within Słupca County, Greater Poland Voivodeship, in west-central Poland.

The village has a population of 120.

References

Anastazewo